Lohse is a German-language surname.

Lohse may also refer to:

Lohse (lunar crater)
Lohse (Martian crater)